"Boys in the Summer" is a song co-written and recorded by American country pop singer Jessie James. It was released June 29, 2010 through Mercury Records and the Island Def Jam Music Group as the intended lead single from her unreleased second studio album, Daughter of a Gypsy.

Different mixes of the song were produced for pop and country radio formats, positioning James as a potential crossover artist following the mainstream success of her debut single, "Wanted", the previous year. The song was James' first to impact the country music genre, reaching number 58 on the Billboard Hot Country Songs chart in addition to charting at number 16 on the Bubbling Under Hot 100 all-genre chart. Her subsequent releases would continue targeting that market.

Composition
"Boys in the Summer" is a country pop song written by Jessie James and James Michael. The single version was produced by John Fields, while the radio-exclusive country mix was produced by Mark Wright.

Music video
Two slightly different music videos were produced for the song (one for the pop version and one for the country), both directed by Roman White. They were filmed on May 18, 2010 and premiered June 18, 2010 as part of CMT's Big New Music Weekend. The videos highlight the song's message of enjoying the joys of summers.

Critical reception
Amar Toor of AOL Radio Blog gave a positive review for the single, saying that "Boys in the Summer" "[was] one of those rare tracks that seem to capture everything good and pure about summer."

Chart performance

Release history

References

2010 singles
Jessie James Decker songs
Music videos directed by Roman White
Mercury Records singles
Show Dog-Universal Music singles
Song recordings produced by Mark Wright (record producer)
2010 songs
Songs written by James Michael